The1975 Wales rugby union tour of Asia was a series of matches played in September 1975 by the Wales national rugby union team. No caps were awarded by the Welsh Rugby Union

Results
Scores and results list Wales' points tally first.

Touring party

Manager: L. M. Spence
Assistant manager: John Dawes
Captain: Mervyn Davies

Backs
Phil Bennett
Roy Bergiers
John Bevan
Roger Blyth
Gerald Davies
Gareth Edwards
Steve Fenwick
Ray Gravell
Clive Rees
Clive Shell
J. J. Williams
J. P. R. Williams

Forwards
Barry Clegg
Terry Cobner
Mervyn Davies
Trefor Evans
Charlie Faulkner
G. Jenkins
Barry Llewelyn
Allan Martin
Graham Price
Derek Quinnell
E. R. Thomas
Geoff Wheel
Bobby Windsor

Notes

References

Wales
tour
tour
Wales national rugby union team tours
Wales